The 2019 Arab Athletics Championships was the twentieth edition of the international athletics competition between Arab countries that took place from 5–8 April 2019 at Cairo, Egypt.

The medal table was topped by Bahrain followed by Morocco and the host nation Egypt.

Medal summary

Men

Women

Medal table

Key

References

Arab Athletics Championships
International athletics competitions hosted by Egypt
Sports competitions in Cairo
Arab Athletics Championships
Arab Athletics Championships
International sports competitions hosted by Egypt
Arab Athletics Championships